William Joseph Smith (1910 – August 4, 1965) was politician in Newfoundland. He represented St. Barbe South in the Newfoundland House of Assembly from 1962 to 1965. He died of heart failure in office in 1965.

References

1910 births
1965 deaths